The 2020–21 Vermont Catamounts men's basketball team represented the University of Vermont in the 2020–21 NCAA Division I men's basketball season. They played their home games at the Patrick Gym in Burlington, Vermont and were led by tenth-year head coach John Becker. They finished the season 10-5, 10-4 in America East Play to finish in 2nd place. In the America East tournament, they lost in the semifinals to Hartford.

Previous season
The Catamounts finished the 2019–20 season 26–7, 14–2 in America East play to win the regular season conference championship. They defeated Maine and UMBC to advance to the championship game of the America East tournament. However, the championship game, along with all other postseason tournaments, were canceled amid the COVID-19 pandemic.

Roster

Schedule and results

|-
!colspan=12 style=| Regular season

|-
!colspan=12 style=| America East tournament
|-

Source

References

Vermont Catamounts men's basketball seasons
Vermont Catamounts
Vermont Catamounts men's basketball
Vermont Catamounts men's basketball